Kinyongia itombwensis is a species of chameleons endemic to the eastern Democratic Republic of the Congo. Its common name is Itombwe forest chameleon.

References

Kinyongia
Lizards of Africa
Reptiles of the Democratic Republic of the Congo
Endemic fauna of the Democratic Republic of the Congo
Reptiles described in 2017
Taxa named by Daniel F. Hughes
Taxa named by Chifundera Kusamba
Taxa named by Eli Greenbaum